Chilmark may be a reference to:

Chilmark, Massachusetts, United States, a town on the island of Martha's Vineyard
Chilmark, Wiltshire, a village in England
Chilmark Quarries, a Site of Special Scientific Interest south of this village
 RAF Chilmark